Yamok station is a railroad station on the Suin-Bundang Line of the Seoul Metropolitan Subway in Hwaseong, Gyeonggi Province, South Korea. It opened on 12 September 2020.

References 

Metro stations in Hwaseong, Gyeonggi
Railway stations opened in 2020
Seoul Metropolitan Subway stations
2020 establishments in South Korea